Steingrímur or Steingrimur may refer to:

Steingrímur Hermannsson (born 1928), the Prime Minister of Iceland
Steingrímur Jónsson (1769–1845), prelate
Steingrimur Rohloff, born in 1971 in Reykjavik/Iceland
Steingrímur J. Sigfússon (born 1955), Icelandic politician and Iceland's Minister of Finance, Fisheries and Agriculture
Steingrímur Steinþórsson (1893–1966), Prime Minister of Iceland from 14 March 1950 to 11 September 1953
Steingrímur Thorsteinsson (1831–1913), Icelandic poet and writer

Icelandic masculine given names